Seberuang is a Malayic Dayak language of Borneo.

References

Ibanic languages
Languages of Indonesia
Agglutinative languages